Arden is an unincorporated community located between Martinsburg and Inwood in Berkeley County, West Virginia, United States.

Arden was named in 1775 by the Quaker Jacob Moon after the district of Arden in Warwickshire, England. It is the location of a number of historic sites including the Arden United Methodist Church, Trinity Church, and Ar-Qua Springs, which is listed on the National Register of Historic Places.

References

Unincorporated communities in Berkeley County, West Virginia
Unincorporated communities in West Virginia